Yiu Tong Chan is an electrical engineer at the Royal Military College in Kingston, Ontario.

Chan was named a Fellow of the Institute of Electrical and Electronics Engineers (IEEE) in 2016 for his contributions to the development of efficient localization and tracking algorithms.

References 

Fellow Members of the IEEE
Living people
Academic staff of the Royal Military College of Canada
Canadian engineers
Year of birth missing (living people)